The American Viola Society (AVS) is an organization headquartered in Dallas, Texas that encourages excellence in performance, pedagogy, research, composition, and lutherie by fostering communication and friendship among violists of all skill levels, ages, nationalities, and backgrounds.

The American Viola Society offers a variety of services to its members and violists worldwide, including the Primrose International Viola Competition, the Gardner Composition Competition, and the Dalton Research Competition; publications, including the Journal of the American Viola Society, the AVS Studio Blog, Teacher's Toolbox, and score downloads; a Viola Bank offering loans of instruments; and a National Teacher Directory. The society has regularly hosted International Viola Congresses as well as American Viola Society Festivals.

History
In 1971, Myron Rosenblum founded the American Viola Research Society, a subset of the Viola-Forschungsgellschaft, now the International Viola Society (IVS). The organization changed its name in 1978 to the American Viola Society to better reflect the interests of its members. In 1979, David Dalton founded the Primrose International Viola Competition in honor of the great Scottish-American violist William Primrose. That same year, the American Viola Society co-commissioned George Rochberg's Viola Sonata in celebration of Primrose's seventy-fifth birthday.

In 1985, the AVS began publishing the Journal of the American Viola Society (JAVS), an outgrowth of the AVS Newsletter that it had previously produced. The JAVS has been a leading source of viola research; notably publishing several articles on the genesis and revision of Béla Bartók's Viola Concerto. Upon retirement of David Dalton as longtime editor in 1999, JAVS established the David Dalton Viola Research Competition for student members of the society.

Primrose International Viola Competition
The Primrose International Viola Competition (PIVC) is an international music competition for viola players sponsored by the American Viola Society and named for the 20th-century virtuoso William Primrose. The PIVC has been held regularly since 1987, often in conjunction with biennial meetings of the North American Viola Congress. Eligible participants are 29 years and younger of any nationality. The competition involves three rounds during a week-long festival in which entrants perform a required work as well as several choices from a viola repertoire list that includes solo works, sonatas, concertos and transcriptions by Primrose.

Maurice Gardner Composition Competition
The AVS inaugurated the biennial Maurice Gardner Composition Competition in 2009. The first winner was pianist/composer Rachel Matthews, whose work Dreams for Viola and Piano was premiered by violist Scott Slapin and the composer at the 2010 International Viola Congress.

Maurice Gardner Composition Competition laureates
 2010 – Rachel Matthews: Dreams for viola and piano (2008); Ourtext Edition
 2012 – Michael Djupstrom: Walimai for alto saxophone (or viola) and piano (2005); Bright Press
 2014 – Matthew Browne: Exit, Pursued by a Bear for viola solo (2012); Maestoso Music
 2016 – Qi Jing: Sonata for solo viola, Threnody (2013)
 2022 – Daniel Reza Sabzghabaei: ...under this blue of my land (زیر همین آبی وطنم...) for viola and voice (2019)

AVS Publications
In 2010 the American Viola Society began digital publication of sheet music under the AVS Publications name. The largest selection of scores to date are works by American composers as part of the "American Viola Project," which aims to "collect, publish, and preserve viola music from the United States." Works by such noted composers as Quincy Porter, Arthur Foote, and Michael Colgrass have been published as well as contributions by less well-known composers. Other publishing priorities include works for multiple violas and movements from the cantatas of J. S. Bach that prominently feature the viola.

AVS Presidents
 1971–1981 Myron Rosenblum, Founder
 1981–1986 Maurice Riley
 1986–1990 David Dalton
 1990–1994 Alan de Veritch
 1994–1998 Thomas Tatton
 1998–2002 Peter Slowik
 2002–2005 Ralph Fielding
 2005–2008 Helen Callus
 2008–2011 Juliet White-Smith
 2011–2014 Nokuthula Ngwenyama
 2014–2017 Kathryn Steely
 2017–2020 Michael Palumbo
 2020–         Hillary Herndon

References

 Pounds, Dwight R. The American Viola Society: A History and Reference. Provo, Utah: American Viola Society, 1993.
 Riley, Maurice W. The History of the Viola. 2 Vols. Ann Arbor, Mich.: Braun-Brumfield, 1980–1991.

External links
Official website
Official Facebook Page

Viola organizations
Music organizations based in the United States